Il medico... la studentessa (The doctor ... the student) is a 1976 Italian commedia sexy all'italiana directed by Silvio Amadio.

Plot 
Claudia (Gloria) is a medical student who encounters many sexual complications with several men.

Cast 
 Gloria Guida: Claudia Raselli
 Jacques Dufilho: Colonel Oreste Raselli
 Pino Colizzi: Dr. Filippo Cinti
 Susan Scott: Luisa
 Ric: Attendente   
 Enrico Beruschi: Bidello

See also    
 List of Italian films of 1976

References

External links

1976 films
Commedia sexy all'italiana
1970s sex comedy films
Films directed by Silvio Amadio
Adultery in films
1976 comedy films
Films scored by Roberto Pregadio
1970s Italian films